Bart Frederikus de Graaff (16 April 1967 – 25 May 2002) was an influential Dutch television presenter, comedian and creator, as well as the founder and chairman of the public broadcasting network BNN.

Early life 
Bart Frederikus de Graaff was born on 16 April 1967 in Haarlem in the Netherlands.

Because of a car accident in his youth in 1976, De Graaff suffered from serious kidney failure for most of his life. This also caused a growth disorder which caused de Graaff to appear much younger than his actual age. In his career as a television presenter he often used childlike appearance to his advantage. For instance, when he hosted the children's TV show B.O.O.S..

Career 

In 1997, he founded a public broadcasting network, Bart's News Network (BNN). After his death, it was renamed to Bart's Neverending Network. Targeted at a youthful audience, the network quickly became known for its sometimes provocative programming. A television show De Grote Donorshow (The Big Donor Show) by BNN won an Emmy Award for Best Non-scripted Entertainment.

Death 
At the end of 1997 De Graaff received a donor kidney and was for a time able to live a relatively normal life. In 1999 the kidney was rejected and his health deteriorated quickly. De Graaff died on 25 May 2002 at the age of 35.

References

External links 
 

1967 births
2002 deaths
Deaths from kidney failure
Dutch male comedians
Dutch people of Indonesian descent
Dutch television presenters
Dutch children's television presenters
Dutch public broadcasting administrators
Kidney transplant recipients
People from Haarlem
20th-century comedians